This is a list of candidates for the 2019 Australian federal election, held on 18 May 2019.

There were 1,514 candidates in total (1,056 for the House of Representatives and 458 for the Senate).

Retiring members
Members of Parliament and Senators who chose not to renominate for the 2019 election were as follows:

Labor
Gai Brodtmann MP (Canberra, ACT) – announced retirement 13 August 2018
Michael Danby MP (Melbourne Ports, Vic) – announced retirement 5 July 2018
Kate Ellis MP (Adelaide, SA) – announced retirement 9 March 2017
Emma Husar MP (Lindsay, NSW) – announced retirement 11 April 2019
Jenny Macklin MP (Jagajaga, Vic) – announced retirement 6 July 2018
Wayne Swan MP (Lilley, Qld) – announced retirement 10 February 2018
Senator Doug Cameron (NSW) – announced retirement 24 July 2016
Senator Claire Moore (Qld) – announced retirement 31 July 2018

Liberal
Julie Bishop MP (Curtin, WA) – announced retirement 21 February 2019
Michael Keenan MP (Stirling, WA) – announced retirement 25 January 2019
Craig Laundy MP (Reid, NSW) – announced retirement 15 March 2019
Kelly O'Dwyer MP (Higgins, Vic) – announced retirement 19 January 2019
Christopher Pyne MP (Sturt, SA) – announced retirement 2 March 2019
Ann Sudmalis MP (Gilmore, NSW) – announced retirement 17 September 2018

Nationals
Andrew Broad MP (Mallee, Vic) – announced retirement 18 December 2018
Luke Hartsuyker MP (Cowper, NSW) – announced retirement 8 August 2018
Senator John Williams (NSW) – announced retirement 31 May 2016

Liberal National
Steven Ciobo MP (Moncrieff, Qld) – announced retirement 1 March 2019
Jane Prentice MP (Ryan, Qld) – lost preselection 12 May 2018, delivered valedictory 4 April 2019
Senator Barry O'Sullivan (Qld) – lost preselection 6 July 2018

Country Liberal
Senator Nigel Scullion (NT) – announced retirement 26 January 2019

Independent
Cathy McGowan MP (Indi, Vic) – announced retirement 14 January 2019
 Senator Tim Storer (SA) – announced retirement 17 April 2019

House of Representatives
Sitting members are listed in bold text. Successful candidates are highlighted in the relevant colour. Where there is possible confusion, an asterisk is used.

Australian Capital Territory

New South Wales

Northern Territory

Queensland

South Australia

Tasmania

Victoria

Western Australia

Senate

Australian Capital Territory
There were 17 Senate candidates for the ACT.

Two seats were up for election. The Labor Party was defending one seat. The Liberal Party was defending one seat.

New South Wales
There were 105 candidates for the Senate in New South Wales.

Six seats were up for election. The Labor Party was defending one seat. The Liberal-National Coalition was defending two seats. The Greens were defending one seat. One Nation was defending one seat, although sitting senator Brian Burston had defected to the United Australia Party. The Liberal Democrats was defending one seat. Senators Concetta Fierravanti-Wells (Liberal), Kristina Keneally (Labor), Jenny McAllister (Labor), Deborah O'Neill (Labor), Marise Payne (Liberal) and Arthur Sinodinos (Liberal) were not up for re-election.

Northern Territory
There were 18 Senate candidates for the NT.

Two seats were up for election. The Labor Party was defending one seat. The Country Liberal Party was defending one seat.

Queensland
There were 83 candidates for the Senate in Queensland.

Six seats were up for election. The Labor Party was defending two seats. The Liberal National Party was defending two seats. The Greens were defending one seat. One Nation was defending one seat, although sitting senator Fraser Anning had defected to his own Conservative National Party. Senators Matt Canavan (Liberal National), Anthony Chisholm (Labor), Pauline Hanson (One Nation), James McGrath (Liberal National), Amanda Stoker (Liberal National) and Murray Watt (Labor) were not up for re-election.

South Australia
There were 42 Senate candidates for the Senate in South Australia.

Six seats were up for election. The Labor Party was defending one seat. The Liberal Party was defending two seats. The Greens were defending one seat. The Centre Alliance, formerly the Nick Xenophon Team, was defending one seat, although sitting senator Tim Storer, who retired, had sat as an independent. One seat had been held by the Family First Party, which was absorbed by the Australian Conservatives; however, sitting senator Lucy Gichuhi defected to the Liberal Party. Senators Cory Bernardi (Conservatives, elected as Liberal), Simon Birmingham (Liberal), Don Farrell (Labor), Stirling Griff (Centre), Rex Patrick (Centre) and Penny Wong (Labor) were not up for re-election.

Tasmania
There were 44 Senate candidates for Tasmania.

Six seats were up for election. The Labor Party was defending three seats. The Liberal Party was defending one seat. The Greens were defending one seat. The Jacqui Lambie Network was defending one seat, although sitting senator Steve Martin had defected to the National Party. Senators Eric Abetz (Liberal), Wendy Askew (Liberal), Jonathon Duniam (Liberal), Helen Polley (Labor), Anne Urquhart (Labor) and Peter Whish-Wilson (Greens) were not up for re-election.

Victoria
There were 82 candidates for the Senate in Victoria.

Six seats were up for election. The Labor Party was defending two seats. The Liberal-National Coalition was defending two seats. The Greens were defending one seat. Derryn Hinch's Justice Party was defending one seat. Senators Kim Carr (Labor), Richard Di Natale (Greens), Mitch Fifield (Liberal), Kimberley Kitching (Labor), Bridget McKenzie (National) and Scott Ryan (Liberal) were not up for re-election.

Western Australia
There were 67 Senate candidates for Western Australia.

Six seats were up for election. The Labor Party was defending two seats. The Liberal Party was defending two seats. The Greens were defending one seat. One Nation was defending one seat. Senators Michaelia Cash (Liberal), Mathias Cormann (Liberal), Sue Lines (Labor), Rachel Siewert (Greens), Dean Smith (Liberal) and Glenn Sterle (Labor) were not up for re-election.

Summary by party 
Beside each party is the number of seats contested by that party in the House of Representatives for each state, as well as an indication of whether the party contested the Senate election in the respective state.

Disendorsements and resignations
There were a number of disendorsements and resignations after the close of nominations on 23 April 2019. As the disendorsements and resignations took place after the close of nominations, their names and party affiliation will still appear on ballot papers.

Candidate controversies

Allegations of Chinese interference

In late 2019, media outlets around the world have reported on alleged efforts by the People's Republic of China to infiltrate the Parliament of Australia by recruiting a spy to run in a constituency during the 2019 Australian federal election.

References

External links
Australian Electoral Commission: House of Representatives and Senate candidates

Candidates
Candidates for Australian federal elections
2019-related lists